Margaret Allette Neckles is a Grenadian politician. She was the first woman President of the Senate from 1990 to 1995.

References

20th-century women politicians
21st-century women politicians
Grenadian women in politics
Living people
Presidents of the Senate of Grenada
Year of birth missing (living people)